"Ice Box" is the second single from American singer-songwriter Omarion's second album, 21. The song features backing vocals and production from Timbaland. The song peaked at number 12 on the US Billboard Hot 100, making it his most successful solo single to date, and reached the top 20 in Denmark, New Zealand, and the United Kingdom. The liner notes credit the production to The Royal Court, whose members include King and Sir John of Timbaland's Camp. The song uses a sample from Yasunori Mitsuda's "Memories of Green" from the video game Chrono Trigger.

The single was released on November 6, 2006, influenced by the romantic relationship between Omarion and his girlfriend that had come to an end. In an interview discussing the song, Omarion speaks in very little detail about the reasons for the music produced. Omarion explains that he and his girlfriend at the time had two different worlds and the timing was not right. An official remix was later released featuring American R&B singer Usher. There is another version of the remix featuring an additional verse by Fabolous.

Composition
"Ice Box" has a moderate tempo and it is written in the key of E-flat major.

Music video
The video starts off with Omarion sitting at a table alone, with flashes of the video. The camera digitally goes inside of Omarion's body and stops to show his beating heart frigid cold. The icy blue heart represents the loneliness Omarion was feeling and also a sense of his pain. The metaphor illustrates Omarion's heart "trapped in an Ice Box". The camera zooms out of his body and the music begins. Omarion's girlfriend, played by Solange Knowles, appears sitting opposite him at the table. Throughout his video, his girlfriend will appear, disappear, and then reappear. The video is then taken into a forest like setting, where Omarion chases his girlfriend around. Scenes cut to Omarion dancing along with male backup dancers, (Choreography completed by Roland Tabor and Blake Anthony). The video ends with Omarion down on his knees after saying "...I'm tired of fighting", and Timbaland rides up in a Phantom and opens the door to let Omarion in. Omarion then puts on a pair of sunglasses and looks at Timbaland who taps the girl on the shoulder before they drive away.

Charts
"Ice Box" is Omarion's most successful single as a solo artist in the United States, as well as his first solo single to chart within the top 20 on the Billboard Hot 100. It has been certified gold in the US as of July 2007. In the United Kingdom, "Ice Box" became Omarion's biggest hit, charting at number 14, becoming his first top-20 hit there.

Weekly charts

Year-end charts

Certifications

Release history

References

 
 

2006 singles
2006 songs
Epic Records singles
Music videos directed by Anthony Mandler
Omarion songs
RCA Records singles
Song recordings produced by Timbaland
Songs written by Ezekiel Lewis
Songs written by Keri Hilson
Songs written by Omarion
Songs written by Patrick "J. Que" Smith
Songs written by Timbaland
Sony BMG singles
Timbaland songs